also known as Naked Ambition is a 1970 Japanese-Malaysian jidaigeki noir film directed by Kazuo Ikehiro. It is based on Jun'ichirō Tanizaki's novel Kyōfu Jidai. All the characters in the film are villains. Kazuo Ikehiro said the film is his favorite film along with Hitori Okami among the films he directed.

Plot
Source:
Wicked woman Ogin is a mistress of Tayu. At first Ogin gains power by poisoning lawful wife of Tayu. To gain more power Ogin let her lover Isogai Iori, kill whoever interrupts her.

Cast
 Michiyo Yasuda as Ogin no Kata
 Masakazu Tamura as Isogai Iori
 Shin Kishida  as Tayu
 Kei Satō as Shunto (Daimyo)
 Akiko Koyama as Umeno
 Kogan Ashiya as Chinsai (Monk)
 Natsuko Oka as Oyui
 Takeshi Date as Ujiei Samon
 Rinichi Yamamoto as Akaza Matajūrō
 Yuzō Hayakawa as Suganuma Hachirōta
 Hōshei Komatsu as Hosoi Gentaku
 Kimiko Tachibana as Wet Nurse

Production
 Yoshinobu Nishioka - Art director

References

External links
 
 Onna Gokuakuchō at Kadokawa/Daiei

Jidaigeki films
Samurai films
Daiei Film films
1970s Japanese films